The Liga Națională Baschet de Masculin (LNBM) is the top-tier professional basketball league of Romania. The winner of the league each season is crowned the Romanian national champion. Founded in 1950, the league consists of 24 teams playing in three different divisions.  Currently, the clubs from the Liga Națională also participate in the European competitions, and can qualify for the Basketball Champions League or the FIBA Europe Cup based on their performance in the national league and cup competition. The most successful club in the league's history is Dinamo București, who has won a record 22 titles. Asesoft Ploieşti won the championship seven times in a row between 2004 and 2010, and again between 2012 and 2014. They became the only Romanian team to win a European title with their success in the FIBA EuroCup Challenge in 2005.

Competition format
Prior to 2018, the men's Liga Națională had 12 teams who played the season in three rounds. The regular season, which began in October, was considered the first round and was played in a normal round-robin, home-and-away format. At the end of the regular season, the top six clubs played a play-off round, while the bottom six clubs played a play-out round. The six teams in the play-off round and the top two in the play-out round qualified for the play-offs, which were played using a knockout format. Since 2014, the quarter-finals, semi-finals, and finals have been best of five. The bottom two teams in the play-out round are relegated to Liga I.

In May 2018, the Romanian Basketball Federation's board of directors decided to entirely reform the system. Liga I was dissolved and the Liga Națională was split into three groups; A, B, and C. Group designation depeneds on performance, financial, and infrastructural criteria. The regular season remains a round-robin in each group. In the second round, the first six teams from Group A are assigned to the Red Group. Teams in 7th and 8th place in Group A, the top three teams from Group B, and the winner of Group C are named the Yellow Group. Teams rank between 4th and 8th place in Group B and the second place team in Group C are assigned to the Blue Group. Those who rank between 3rd and 8th place in Group C are designated as the Green Group.

In the second round of the restructured season, teams in the Red Group keep their points while the Yellow, Blue, and Green Groups all begin with zero points. In the third round of the championship, the first two teams from the Yellow Group join the Red Group teams for the play-offs, which use a knockout format. The quarter-finals, semi-finals, and finals continue to be best of five. To determine the teams ranked between 5th and 8th place, the best of three system is used. Remaining teams form two eight-team groups to determine their final rankings.

Notable Liga Națională players
At least five former Romanian players have been inducted into the European Basketball Hall of Fame.
 Gheorghe Mureșan – initially signed in 1993 with the Washington Bullets and played six seasons in the NBA. He was the tallest player in the league and averaged 9.8 points, 6.4 rebounds, and 0.5 assists. He was named the NBA Most Improved Player following the 1995–96 NBA season. He played for two years with Universitatea Cluj-Napoca.
 Antonio Alexe – played his entire professional career in the Romanian and Hungarian basketball leagues. He was Romanian champion twice with Asesoft Ploiești and once with West Petrom Arad. His career was cut short by his 2005 death in a car accident.
 Constantin Popa – played in Divizia A for BC Dinamo București before joining the University of Miami in the NCAA Division I. He is the tallest player in the history of the school. Though he was drafted by the Los Angeles Clippers in 1995, he did not play in the NBA. He joined the CBA before returning to Europe.
 Cătălin Burlacu – in addition to playing in Romania with West Petrom Arad and Asesoft Ploiești, Burlacu played in the Italian, Estonian, and German basketball leagues. He won the Liga Națională championship with Asesoft Ploiești in 2004-2006, 2008-2010, and 2012-2014.
 Levente Szijarto – spent his career in the Romanian basketball league with West Petrom Arad, U Mobitelco Cluj, and Asesoft Ploiești. He won the championship with Asesoft Ploiești in 2003-2010 and 2012-2014.

Titles

Latest finals

See also
 Romanian Women's Basketball League

References

External links
Official site of the Romanian basketball federation 
Baschet.ro News and results 
Romanian league on Eurobasket

 
Basketball competitions in Romania
Basketball leagues in Europe
Professional sports leagues in Romania